Reticulidia gofasi is a species of sea slug, a dorid nudibranch, a shell-less marine gastropod mollusk in the family Phyllidiidae.

Distribution
This species was described from a seamount at Josephine Bank  in 200–205 m, with other specimens from different seamount locations in the NE Atlantic Ocean.

Description
This nudibranch is pale yellow, with conical tubercles. It was placed in the genus Reticulidia because of the distinctive structure of the pharyngeal bulb.

Diet
This species feeds on a sponge.

References

Phyllidiidae
Gastropods described in 1996